"Look Away" is a song by Scottish rock band Big Country. It was released in April 1986 as the lead single from their third studio album, The Seer. It gave the group their fourth UK top 10 hit, and proved to be their highest-charting single in the UK Singles Chart, peaking at No. 7.

"Look Away" was an even bigger success in Ireland, topping the Irish Singles Chart for one week, and becoming the band's only number one single on either side of the Irish Sea.

Chart positions

References

1986 singles
Big Country songs
Irish Singles Chart number-one singles
Songs written by Stuart Adamson
Rock ballads